The Christmas Island, part of the New Year Group, is a  granite island located in the Great Australian Bight, lying off the north-west coast of Tasmania, Australia. According to the International Hydrographic Organization, the line separating Bass Strait from the Great Australian Bight runs through King Island, so Christmas Island lies in the Great Australian Bight.

The island forms part of the King Island Important Bird Area because of its importance for breeding seabirds and waders.

Fauna
Breeding seabird and shorebird species include little penguin, short-tailed shearwater, Pacific gull, silver gull, sooty oystercatcher, pied oystercatcher and black-faced cormorant. Reptiles include tiger snakes and lizards. A species of mouse is present.

See also

 List of islands of Tasmania

References

Protected areas of Tasmania
Important Bird Areas of Tasmania
King Island (Tasmania)